= Vehicle registration plates of Qatar =

State of Qatar
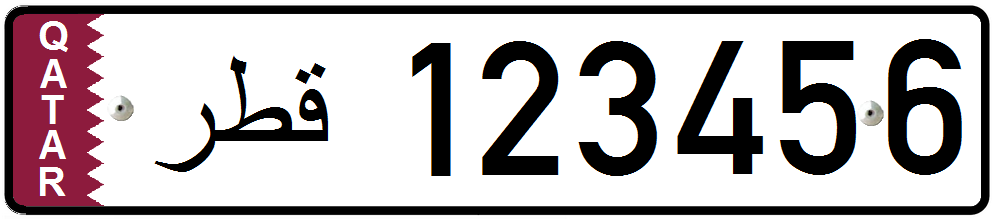
- Qatari regular legal standard number plate
- Country: Qatar
- Country code: Q

Current series
- Size: 520 mm × 110 mm 20.5 in × 4.3 in
- Serial format: 123(45) - Single digits are used by the Royal family
- Colour (front): Black on white
- Colour (rear): Black on white

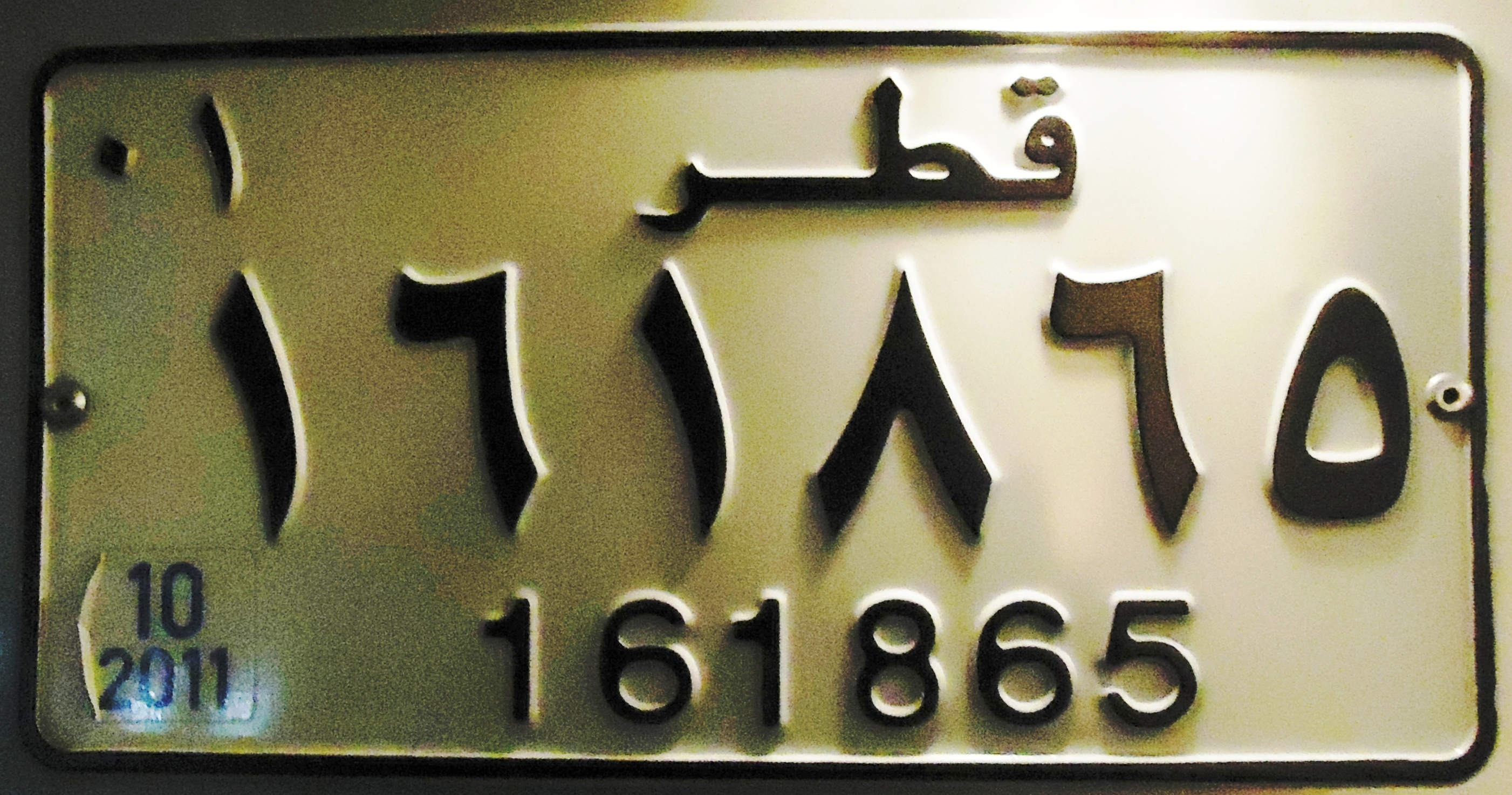
Plate design from 1997–2011.

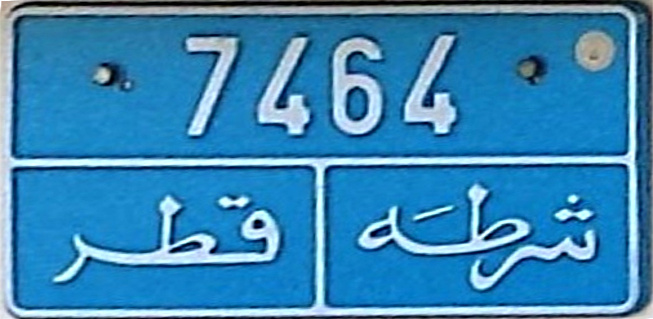
A Qatari police license plate.

Vehicle registration plates of Qatar were introduced in the 1950s. The current version was adopted in 2012, with a new design announced in 2025 currently rolling out. The international vehicle registration code for Qatar is Q.

In a 2016 auction, licence plate 411 was sold for $960,000.
